Samra Brouk (born May 20, 1986) is an American politician from the state of New York. A Democrat, Brouk has represented the 55th district of the New York State Senate, based in Rochester and its eastern suburbs, since January 2021.

Early career
The daughter of Ethiopian immigrants, Brouk was born and raised in Rochester and nearby Pittsford. After graduating from Williams College and serving in the Peace Corps, Brouk held jobs at non-profits including DoSomething and Chalkbeat.

Political history
In November 2019, Brouk launched her campaign for the 55th district of the New York State Senate, running against Republican incumbent Rich Funke. A month later, however, Funke chose to retire rather than seek a fourth term. Brouk faced no opposition in the Democratic primary and won the general election over Republican Christopher Missick, winning 57% of the vote to his 42%, flipping the seat.

New York State Senate 
Brouk is currently the chair of the Mental Health Committee, and she is a member of the Aging Committee, the Alcoholism and Substance Abuse Committee, the Education Committee, the Elections Committee, the Health Committee, and the Women's Issues Committee.

Personal life
Brouk lives in Rochester with her husband, Brian.

References

Living people
1986 births
Politicians from Rochester, New York
New York (state) Democrats
Women state legislators in New York (state)
African-American state legislators in New York (state)
American people of Ethiopian descent
21st-century American politicians
21st-century American women politicians
Williams College alumni
21st-century African-American women
21st-century African-American politicians
20th-century African-American people
20th-century African-American women